Linda Jeanne Mealey (December 17, 1955 in San Diego, California – November 5, 2002) was an American evolutionary psychologist and professor at the College of Saint Benedict.

Biography
Mealey was born in San Diego, California on December 17, 1955, and grew up mainly in Cincinnati, Ohio. She received her PhD from the University of Texas at Austin in December 1984. She joined the faculty of the College of Saint Benedict in 1985 as an assistant professor, and became an associate professor there in 1991. She was affiliated with the University of Queensland's School of Psychology from 1996 to 1998, and remained an adjunct professor there until her death from cancer in 2002.

Research
Mealey's research into evolutionary psychology examined factors such as the attractiveness of symmetrical human faces and potential evolutionary explanations for sociopathy.

Professional affiliations and awards
Mealey was a member of about 16 professional societies during her career. She served as president of the International Society for Human Ethology, and was also a counselor for the Human Behavior and Evolution Society. In 2002, she received the College of Saint Benedict's Teacher/Scholar Award, which was subsequently renamed the Linda Mealey Teacher/Scholar Award after her death.

References

External links
Obituary in Neuroendocrinology Letters (written by Nancy Segal)

1955 births
2002 deaths
College of Saint Benedict and Saint John's University faculty
Evolutionary psychologists
American women psychologists
20th-century American psychologists
University of Texas at Austin alumni
People from San Diego
Academic staff of the University of Queensland
Deaths from cancer in Minnesota
20th-century American women
20th-century American people
American women academics